Sodium tris(carbonato)cobalt(III) is the name given to the inorganic compound with the formula Na3Co(CO3)3•3H2O.  The salt contains an olive-green metastable cobalt(III) coordination complex.  The salt is sometimes referred to as the “Field-Durrant precursor” and is prepared by the  “Field-Durrant synthesis”. It is used in the synthesis of other cobalt(III) complexes.  Otherwise cobalt(III) complexes are generated from cobalt(II) precursors, a process that requires an oxidant.

Synthesis
An aqueous solution of cobalt(II) nitrate and hydrogen peroxide is added to a solution of sodium bicarbonate, leading to precipitation of the olive solid.  The method is a modification of the synthesis of what has been described as “Co2(CO3)3”.

Structure and synthetic applications
The identity of this complex anion is uncertain, suggestions include [Co(κ2-CO3)3]3-, [Co(κ1-CO3H)3(OH)3]3-, and [Co(κ2-CO3)2(κ1-CO3)(OH2)]3-. Thermal gravimetric analysis favors the presence of one aquo ligand,  and infra-red spectroscopy indicates the presence of both bi- and unidentate carbonate ligands.  The addition of [Co(NH3)6]Cl3 to fresh solutions of sodium tris(carbonato)cobalt(III) precipitates anhydrous salt [Co(NH3)6][Co(κ2-CO3)3]. This salt has been characterized by X-ray crystallography, which established that the anionic complex features three bidentate (κ2-) carbonate ligands. 

To some extent, the exact description of the title salt is unimportant since it is only used as a synthetic intermediate, it has no intrinsic value. Products include [Co(H2O)6]3+, [Co(κ2-CO3)(H2O)4]+, and [Co(κ2-CO3)2(H2O)2]- and their derivatives where the aquo ligand has been displaced.  The closely related potassium tris(carbonatocobalt(III) has also been used for the preparation of diverse complexes.  These derivatives include [Co(NH3)2(κ2-CO3)2]- and  [Co(CN)2(κ2-CO3)2]3-, rare examples of biscarbonato cobalt(III) complexes. Other derivatives include the dinitrite [Co(NH3)2(κ2-CO3)(NO2)2]- and the oxalate [Co(NH3)2(κ2-CO3)(C2O4)]-.

Other literature

References

Cobalt complexes
Cobalt(III) compounds
Inorganic compounds
Carbonates
Octahedral compounds
Ammine complexes